Daggett may refer to:

Places

United States
 Daggett, California
 Daggett, Indiana
 Daggett, Michigan
 Daggett Township, Michigan
 Daggett, Pennsylvania
 Daggett County, Utah
 Daggett Brook, a stream in Minnesota
 Daggett Brook Township, Minnesota

People
 Aaron Daggett (1837–1938), the last surviving Union general of the American Civil War when he died at the age of 100
 Avalon Daggett (1907–2002), American filmmaker
 Beverly Daggett (1945-2015), a politician from Maine
 Chris Daggett, (born 1950), Independent candidate for governor of New Jersey in 2009 election
 David Daggett (1764–1851), American politician from Connecticut and a founder of the Yale Law School
 Hallie Morse Daggett (1878–1964), first woman fire observer for US Forest Service
 Harriet Daggett, (1891–1966), American academic and lawyer
 Henry J. Daggett (1826–1910), New York assemblyman
 Horace Daggett (1931-1998), American politician from Iowa
 John Daggett (1833–1919), Lieutenant Governor of California 1883-87
 John D. Daggett (1793–1874), mayor of St Louis, Missouri 1841-42
 Mike Daggett (?-1911), involved in the Battle of Kelley Creek
 Naphtali Daggett (1727–1780), president pro tempore of Yale College
 Rollin M. Daggett (1831–1901), American politician and diplomat
 Rufus Daggett (1838–1912), American Union Civil War era brevet brigadier general  
 Tim Daggett (born 1962), American gymnast
 Valerie Daggett, professor of bioengineering at the University of Washington

Other
 Daggett Beaver, one of the co-stars of the animated show The Angry Beavers
 USS Daggett County (LST-689), tank landing ship in World War II
 J. Noble Daggett, Mattie's lawyer in True Grit
 Daggett School District, Daggett County, Utah

See also
 Daget